Fictional detectives are characters in detective fiction. These individuals have long been a staple of detective mystery crime fiction, particularly in detective novels and short stories. Much of early detective fiction was written during the "Golden Age of Detective Fiction" (1920s–1930s). These detectives include amateurs, private investigators and professional policemen. They are often popularized as individual characters rather than parts of the fictional work in which they appear. Stories involving individual detectives are well-suited to dramatic presentation, resulting in many popular theatre, television, and film characters.

The first famous detective in fiction was Edgar Allan Poe's C. Auguste Dupin. Later, Sir Arthur Conan Doyle's Sherlock Holmes became the most famous example and remains so to this day. The detectives are often accompanied by a Dr. Watson–like assistant or narrator.

Types 
Fictional detectives generally fit one of four archetypes:
 The amateur detective (Miss Marple, Jessica Fletcher, Lord Peter Wimsey); From outside the field of criminal investigation, but gifted with knowledge, curiosity, desire for justice, etc.
 The private investigator (Cordelia, Holmes, Marlowe, Spade, Poirot, Magnum, Millhone); Works professionally in criminal and civic investigations, but outside the criminal justice system.
 The police detective (Dalgliesh, Kojak, Morse, Columbo, Alleyn, Maigret); Part of an official investigative body, charged with solving crimes.
 The forensic specialist (Scarpetta, Quincy, Cracker, CSI teams, Thorndyke); Affiliated with investigative body, officially tasked with specialized scientific results rather than solving the crime as a whole.
Notable fictional detectives and their creators include:

Amateur detectives

 Misir Ali – part-time professor of psychology at University of Dhaka, created by Humayun Ahmed
Arjun – young detective from Jalpaiguri in West Bengal, created by Samaresh Majumdar
P. K. Basu – criminal lawyer, created by Narayan Sanyal
 Trixie Belden – teen detective, created by Julie Campbell Tatham
 Boston Blackie – reformed jewel thief, created by Jack Boyle
 Rosemary Boxer – with Laura Thyme, gardening detective, created by Brian Eastman
 Beatrice Adela Lestrange Bradley – widowed socialite, created by Gladys Mitchell
 Father Brown – Catholic priest, created by English novelist G. K. Chesterton. Stars in 51 detective short stories 
 Encyclopedia Brown – boy detective Leroy Brown, nicknamed "Encyclopedia" for his intelligence and range of knowledge. 
 Cadfael – early 12th-century monk solves murders and social problems, created by Ellis Peters, also known as Edith Pargeter.
 Jonathan Creek – creative consultant to a magician, in a British TV series by the same name, written by David Renwick.
 Nancy Drew – High school sleuth, created by Edward Stratemeyer.
 C. Auguste Dupin – upper class character created by Edgar Allan Poe. Dupin made his first appearance in Poe's "The Murders in the Rue Morgue" (1841), widely considered the first detective fiction story. 
 Dr Gideon Fell – "lexicographer" and drinker, created by John Dickson Carr
 Sister Fidelma – A Celtic nun in the 7th century who solves mysteries, by Peter Berresford Ellis
 The Famous Five (novel series) - Kid detectives and her pet dog created by Enid Blyton.
 Jessica Fletcher – writer, created by William Link and Richard Levinson for Murder, She Wrote TV series (1984–1996)
Pandab Goenda – team of five child detectives, created by Sasthipada Chattopadhyay
Gogol – teenage detective, created by Samaresh Basu
 Beverly Gray – protagonist of the Beverly Gray Mystery series by Clair Blank
 Cordelia Gray – private detective in London in novels and TV by P. D. James
The Hardy Boys – Sibling high school sleuths, (Frank & Joe) created by Edward Stratemeyer. 
 Jonathan & Jennifer Hart – millionaire  couple, created by Sidney Sheldon
 Patrick Jane – con artist, created by Bruno Heller for The Mentalist TV series
Jagga Jasoos – young detective, created by Anurag Basu for the eponymous film
 Al Moghameron Al Khamsa (The Five Adventurers or The Adventurous Five) - kid detectives created by Egyptian writer Mahmoud Salem.
 Jayanta & Manik – amateur detective duo created by Bengali novelist Hemendra Kumar Roy
Kakababu – former director of the Archaeological Survey of India, created by Sunil Gangopadhyay
 Sally Lockhart – teenage girl, created by Philip Pullman
 Miss Marple – a small town old spinster who solves a number of crimes using common sense, created by Agatha Christie 
 Veronica Mars – school girl whose father is a private detective, created by Rob Thomas
 Amelia Peabody – Egyptologist who solves a variety of dastardly crimes in turn-of-the-century Egypt, created by Elizabeth Peters. 
 Ellery Queen – author and editor of a magazine, created by two writers, using the pseudonym Ellery Queen
 Easy Rawlins – black WWII veteran from Houston. All stories take place in Los Angeles during the 50s & 60s. Created by Walter Mosley.  
 Joseph Rouletabille – journalist created by French writer Gaston Leroux. Main character in The Mystery of the Yellow Room.
 Niladri Sarkar – retired colonel, naturist and amateur investigator, created by Bengali writer Syed Mustafa Siraj
 Laura Thyme – with Rosemary Boxer, gardening detective, created by Brian Eastman
 Dr. John Thorndyke – medical doctor who trained to become a forensic specialist, created by R. Austin Freeman
 Philip Trent – gentleman sleuth, created by E. C. Bentley
 Professor Augustus S. F. X. Van Dusen – created by Jacques Futrelle
 Hetty Wainthropp – retired working-class woman, created by David Cook
 Lord Peter Wimsey – wealthy English gentleman, created by Dorothy L. Sayers, assisted by his valet (and batman from WW1) Bunter and then Harriet Vane
 Kyoko Kirigiri - a former detective from the game Danganronpa: Trigger Happy Havoc
 Shuichi Saihara - main detective and second protagonist in Danganronpa V3: Killing Harmony
 Three Investigators - An American juvenile detective book series created by Robert Arthur Jr.

Private investigators

 David Addison in Moonlighting – created by Glenn Gordon Caron
 Angel (Buffy the Vampire Slayer) – Vampire with a soul and private investigator in Los Angeles
Byomkesh Bakshi – created by Sharadindu Bandyopadhyay
Goenda Baradacharan – created by Shirshendu Mukhopadhyay
 Parashor Barma – created by Premendra Mitra
 Batman – World's Greatest Detective in the DC Universe – created by Bob Kane and Bill Finger 
 Tommy and Tuppence Beresford – created by Agatha Christie
 Benoit Blanc - created by Rian Johnson
 Jackson Brodie – created by Kate Atkinson
 Nestor Burma – created by Léo Malet
 Albert Campion – created by Margery Allingham
 Pepe Carvalho – created by Manuel Vázquez Montalbán
 Richard Castle – Very successful novelist and private investigator
 Nick & Nora Charles – created by Dashiell Hammett
Dipak Chatterjee – created by Swapan Kumar
 Elvis Cole – created by Robert Crais
 Bulldog Drummond – created by H. C. McNeile
 Feluda – created by Satyajit Ray
 Phryne Fisher – created by Kerry Greenwood
Ganesh – created by Sujatha
 Garrett – created by Glen Cook
 Cordelia Gray – created by P. D. James
 Peter Gunn – created by Blake Edwards
 Mike Hammer – created by Mickey Spillane
 Madelyn "Maddie" Hayes  in Moonlighting – created by Glenn Gordon Caron
Mitin Masi – created by Suchitra Bhattacharya
 Sherlock Holmes – created by Sir Arthur Conan Doyle
 Jack Irish – created by Peter Temple
 Jessica Jones - created by Brian Michael Bendis and Michael Gaydos
 Jake Lassiter – created by Paul Levine
 Bernie Little – in the Chet and Bernie Mystery Series, created by Spencer Quinn
 L. Lawliet – created by Tsugumi Ohba and Takeshi Obata
 Thomas Magnum – created by Donald P. Bellisario for Magnum, P.I. TV series
 Joe Mannix – created by  Richard Levinson and William Link for Mannix TV series
 Philip Marlowe – created by Raymond Chandler
 Veronica Mars – created by Rob Thomas TV Series (books based on TV Series. Movie based on TV series)
 Kinsey Millhone – created by Sue Grafton for her "alphabet mysteries" series of novels.
 Tess Monaghan, created by Laura Lippman
 Adrian Monk – created by Andy Breckman for Monk TV series
 Lucifer Morningstar – Former King of Hell and successful nightclub owner and private investigator
 Kogoro Mori, created by Gosho Aoyama
 Bhaduri Moshai – created by Nirendranath Chakraborty
 Hercule Poirot – created by Agatha Christie
 Precious Ramotswe – created by Alexander McCall Smith
 Jeff Randall – created by Dennis Spooner for Randall and Hopkirk (Deceased) TV series 
 Jim Rockford – created by Roy Huggins and Stephen J. Cannell for The Rockford Files TV series
 Kiriti Roy – created by Indian dermatologist and a popular Bengali novelist Nihar Ranjan Gupta
 John Shaft – created by Ernest Tidyman
 Sam Spade – created by Dashiell Hammett
 Shawn Spencer and Burton Guster – created by Steve Franks for Psych TV series
 Spenser – created by Robert B. Parker
 Remington Steele – created by Robert Butler, Michael Gleason for Remington Steele TV series
 Jake Styles – created by Dean Hargrove and Joel Steiger for Jake and the Fatman TV series
 Cormoran Strike – created by Robert Galbraith (a pen name of J.K. Rowling)
 Philo Vance – created by S. S. Van Dine
 V. I. Warshawski – created by Sara Paretsky
 Nero Wolfe – created by Rex Stout
 The Continental Op – created by Dashiell Hammett
 Matt Houston – created by Lawrence Gordon

Police detectives

 Furuhata Ninzaburō – created by Kōki Mitani, a Japanese version of Columbo
Thomson and Thompson – from The Adventures of Tintin, created by Hergé
 Judge Dee – 18th century Chinese fictionalized magistrate with later editions by Robert van Gulik
 Inspector Roderick Alleyn – created by Ngaio Marsh
 87th Precinct detectives – created by Ed McBain
 Superintendent Battle – created by Agatha Christie
 Napoleon Bonaparte (Bony) – created by Arthur Upfield
 Harry Bosch – created by Michael Connelly 
 Inspector Alan Banks - Created by Peter Robinson
 Charlie Chan – created by Earl Derr Biggers
 Inspector Clouseau – from The Pink Panther franchise
 Columbo – from the American TV series Columbo, created by William Link and Richard Levinson
 Popeye Doyle – based on the real Detective Eddie Egan
 Sergeant Cork – created by Ted Willis
 Inspector Adam Dalgleish – created by P. D. James
 Inspector French (Joseph French) – created by Freeman Wills Crofts
 Inspector Frost – created by R. D. Wingfield
 D.C.S. Christopher Foyle – from the British TV series Foyle's War, created by Anthony Horowitz
 Inspector Japp – created by Agatha Christie
 Richard Jury – created by mystery author Martha Grimes
 Lt. Theo Kojak – TV series (played by Telly Savalas)
 Inspector Lestrade – created by Sir Arthur Conan Doyle
 Judge Bao – Chinese judge and investigator
 Chief Inspector Robert Macdonald – created by E.C.R. Lorac
 Steve McGarrett – Hawaii Five-O TV series
 Jules Maigret – created by Georges Simenon
 Adrian Monk – created by Andy Breckman and David Hoberman
 Inspector Morse – created by Colin Dexter 
 Detective William Murdoch – created by Maureen Jennings
 Inspector Palmu – created by Mika Waltari 
 Inspector Walter Purbright - created by Colin Watson
 Inspector Rebus – created by Ian Rankin
 Dave Robicheaux – created by James Lee Burke
 Inspector Simon Serrailler – created by Susan Hill 
 Dick Tracy – created by Chester Gould
 Inspector Wallander – created by Henning Mankell
 Chief Inspector Armand Gamache – created by Louise Penny
 Shabor Dasgupta – created by Shirshendu Mukhopadhyay
 Inspector Alan Grant – created by Josephine Tey
 Jake Peralta - from Brooklyn Nine-Nine - created by Dan Goor and Michael Schur

Forensic specialists

 Temperance Brennan – Bones TV series based on the books by Kathy Reichs
 Donald "Ducky" Mallard – NCIS TV series
 Dexter Morgan – Dexter TV series
 Henry Morgan – Forever TV series immortal medical examiner and private investigator
 Dr. Lancelot Priestly – created by John Rhode
 Dr. R. Quincy – Quincy, M.E. TV series
 Lincoln Rhyme and  Amelia Sachs – created by Jeffery Deaver
 Elizabeth Rodgers – Law & Order TV series
 Dr. Kay Scarpetta – created by Patricia Cornwell
 Abby Sciuto – NCIS TV series
 Dr. John Thorndyke – created by R. Austin Freeman
 Bruce Wayne – Batman comics and adaptions
 Barry Allen – Flash comics and adaptions

CSI: Crime Scene Investigation TV shows
 Stella Bonasera – CSI: NY TV series
 Horatio Caine – CSI: Miami TV series
 Jo Danville – CSI: NY TV series
 Calleigh Duquesne – CSI: Miami TV series
 Gil Grissom – CSI: Crime Scene Investigation TV series
 Raymond Langston – CSI: Crime Scene Investigation TV series
 D. B. Russell – CSI: Crime Scene Investigation TV series
 Mac Taylor – CSI: NY TV series
 Catherine Willows – CSI: Crime Scene Investigation TV series

Anime and manga

 Hajime Kindaichi – character from the manga and anime series Kindaichi Case Files.
 Shinichi Kudo/Conan Edogawa – protagonist of Gosho Aoyama's series Case Closed, which is known in Japan as Meitantei Conan.
 L – a detective featured in the Death Note series created by Tsugumi Ohba and Takeshi Obata
 Alice – protagonist of Kamisama no memochou, a NEET Detective.
 Sou Touma – main character of the Q.E.D. series created and produced by Motohiro Katou.
 Kyoko Kirigiri – character in Danganronpa: Trigger Happy Havoc started off as "Ultimate ???" revealed as the "Ultimate Detective".
 Shuichi Saihara – character in Danganronpa V3: Killing Harmony known as the 'Ultimate Detective".
 Naoto Shirogane – character in Persona 4 who is lonely, has a 200 level IQ, has insecurities on her age and her gender, and is the Detective Prince. Her weapon of choice is a handgun, mostly a revolver. She is currently voiced by Mary Elizabeth McGlynn.
 Goro Akechi – character in Persona 5 who is the charismatic, lonely and wanting to be at the centre of attention at all times, pancake loving, black mask wearing, Second Advent of the Detective Prince. His Metaverse weapons of choice are, a chainsaw sword, a laser sabre, a serrated blade, and a ray gun. He is currently voiced by Robbie Daymond
Dick Gumshoe – character from the manga and video game series Ace Attorney.
Grévil de Blois - inspector working in Sauville's police department. Featured in the novel series Gosick created by Kazuki Sakuraba.
 Siesta - character from the Light Novel and anime series The Detective Is Already Dead.

See also
Crime fiction
List of male detective characters
List of female detective characters
List of fictional historical detectives
List of fictional detective teams
List of fictional detectives for younger readers
List of fictional science fiction and fantasy detectives
Spy film

Notes

References
 Julian Symons. The Great Detectives: Seven Original Investigation，1981，

External links
Stop, You're Killing Me! (a list of fictional detectives found in novels)